Pterygota macrocarpa is a species of flowering plant in the family Malvaceae. It is found in Cameroon, Ivory Coast, Ghana, Nigeria, and Sierra Leone. It is threatened by habitat loss.

References

Sterculioideae
Vulnerable plants
Taxonomy articles created by Polbot